Donald George Dutton (born October 9, 1943) is a Canadian psychologist who is a tenured professor emeritus in the Department of Psychology at the University of British Columbia. He received his Ph.D. in social psychology from the University of Toronto in 1970.

References

External links

Faculty page

Living people
1943 births
Canadian psychologists
University of Toronto alumni
Academic staff of the University of British Columbia
Social psychologists